Jean L. MacFarland is a justice of the Court of Appeal for Ontario. She is a graduate of Queen's University Faculty of Law. She also previously served on the Ontario Superior Court of Justice.

References

Living people
Year of birth missing (living people)
Justices of the Court of Appeal for Ontario
Place of birth missing (living people)
Queen's University Faculty of Law alumni
21st-century Canadian judges